Dreyer's Grand Ice Cream, Inc. ("Dreyer's"), is an American ice cream company, founded in 1928 in Oakland, California, where its present-day headquarters office remains. The company's two signature brands, Dreyer's Grand Ice Cream and Edy's Grand Ice Cream, are named after its founders, William Dreyer and Joseph Edy. The Dreyer's brand is sold in the Western United States and Texas, while the Edy's brand is sold in the Eastern and Midwestern United States.

In 2002, Dreyer's was acquired by Nestlé. In 2020, Froneri, the joint venture between Nestlé and PAI Partners, agreed to take over all of Nestlé's U.S. ice cream businesses, including Dreyer's, Häagen-Dazs, and Drumstick.

History 
The company's two signature brand names, Edy's and Dreyer's, honor the company's founders: Joseph Edy, a candy maker, and William Dreyer, an ice cream maker. Joseph Oliver Edy was born in Missouri and raised in Montana. Edy operated a homemade candy and ice cream parlor at 122 North Broadway in Billings, Montana during the 1910s. In the 1920s he and his wife Grace decided to join his brother in California. In 1925 Joseph Edy opened the doors to Edy's Character Candies Shop in Oakland. Edy's high-quality candy quickly became recognized as among the best in the East Bay Area, and Edy was soon operating six shops. William Dreyer also ran a business in the 1920s, an ice cream manufacturing venture in the California dairy country community of Visalia. In 1926 he was recruited to run a large new plant in Oakland for National Ice Cream.  While in Oakland, he met Joe Edy.

In 1928 Edy and Dreyer decided to join forces to manufacture ice cream. They secured a small factory and launched Edy's Grand Ice Cream (the "Grand" reflected their street address on Grand Avenue in Oakland). They focused on creative innovations to fuel their small venture. For example, the two men used Joseph Edy's knowledge and expertise in candy-making to create the original Rocky Road ice cream, from a combination of flavors which Edy had previously invented. The chocolate, marshmallow, and nut flavor was named Rocky Road as a means of describing the ice cream's texture as well as the troubled economic times of the Great Depression. 

Edy and Dreyer are also credited with originating the Toasted Almond and Candy Mint flavors. At the time ice cream had limited flavors such as vanilla, chocolate, and strawberry, but Rocky Road, introduced in 1929, was one of the first combination of flavors. Because only large marshmallows were manufactured at the time, he used his wife's sewing scissors to cut marshmallows into bite-sized pieces to make the first batch of Rocky Road.

In 1947 the partnership was dissolved and in 1953, William Dreyer Jr. took over and changed the name to Dreyer's Grand Ice Cream. In 1963, Dreyer Jr. sold the company to his key officers—Al Wolff who ran the factory, Bob Boone who ran distribution, and Ken Cook, who managed sales and served as president from 1963 to 1977. Cook's vision was to provide American families with a truly premium ice cream they could enjoy at home. In 1977, with sales of $6 million and an employee base of 75 people, Cook sold the company to T. Gary Rogers and W.F. "Rick" Cronk for $1 million. In 1981 the company expanded and re-adopted the name Edy's Grand Ice Cream when marketing its product east of the Rocky Mountains, so as to not be confused with another company named Breyers (today owned by Unilever).  Hence they market under the Dreyer's name in the Western United States and Texas, and under the Edy's name in the Eastern and Midwestern United States.

In 2002 Nestlé agreed to acquire Dreyer's for $3.2 billion. In December 2019, Nestlé announced that it would be selling all of its U.S. ice cream businesses (including Dreyer's, Häagen-Dazs, and Drumstick) to Froneri, the global ice cream manufacturer that Nestlé co-owns with PAI Partners.

Timeline 

 1906: William Dreyer made his first frozen dessert to celebrate his ship's arrival in America from Germany.
 1919: Edy's is sold, according to the Billings Gazette in Montana, September 14.
 1928: William Dreyer and Joseph Edy found Edy's Grand Ice Cream.
 1947:  Dreyer and Edy dissolve their partnership and Dreyer purchases and builds a new manufacturing plant at 5929 College Avenue in Oakland.  After the dissolution of the partnership, Edy continued business under the Edy's name, operating several ice cream parlors in the San Francisco Bay area, selling candy and ice cream manufactured at the Edy's factory in Oakland.  Edy's were located in Palo Alto at the Town and Country Shopping Center, in San Francisco, Berkeley and several other Bay area cities.  In 1961 an Edy's opened in Carmel-by-the-Sea under a franchise agreement.  
 1963:  Reins to the business pass from the Dreyer family to Ken Cook, who becomes President.
 1977:  T. Gary Rogers and W.F. Cronk purchase Dreyer's Grand Ice Cream for $1 million.  
 1981: Dreyer's went public and its shares were traded on NASDAQ under the ticker symbol "DRYR". The company also re-adopts the Edy's Grand Ice Cream name when marketing its product east of the Rocky Mountains, so its not confused with Breyers. Around this same time, current Dreyer's President Ken Cook went into the vanilla business. Since that time Dreyer's ice cream has been made with Cook's Vanilla which is produced by Cook Flavoring Company.
 2002: In June, Nestlé acquired Dreyer's for $3.2 billion, thus becoming the biggest ice cream maker, with a 17.5% market share. Dreyer's has also acquired its own ice cream brands, including the Snelgrove's Ice Cream brand in Utah.
 2004: Dreyer's began using a new churning processes called low-temperature extrusion. Unlike traditional churning methods, the ice cream does not need to be frozen once it is done churning. Since this freezing stage produces large ice crystals, which gives the ice cream a grainy texture, manufacturers would add milk fat to counterbalance the grainy texture. As this extra freezing process isn't necessary with low-temperature extrusion, the "slow churned" line of ice cream is labeled as containing two-thirds the calories and half the fat of "regular" ice cream. Dreyer's has also extended this process to other brands besides its two flagship brands, such as Häagen-Dazs, which it produces under a license from General Mills.
 2006: Dreyer's Whiskey Bottom Ice Cream plant in Laurel, Maryland, is expanded to give Dreyer's the two largest ice cream plants in the United States.
 2016: Nestlé and PAI Partners agree to set up a joint venture, Froneri, to combine their ice cream and frozen food activities. Froneri initially is only set up for those businesses in Europe and other international countries.
 2020: Nestle sells all of its US ice cream businesses, including Dreyer's, Häagen-Dazs, and Drumstick to Froneri for $4 billion.

Cost-cutting changes
In 2002, Nestlé insisted on a smaller container to increase profits and so the standard US half gallon (2 quart) container (1.89 L) was downsized to 1.75 quarts (1.65 L).  In May 2008, the 1.75 quart container was further downsized to 1.5 quarts (1.42 L). Most other ice cream manufacturers, with the notable exception of Blue Bell, followed the downsizing move.

References

External links

 

Companies based in Oakland, California
Food and drink companies established in 1928
Dairy products companies in California
Ice cream brands
Froneri
1928 establishments in California
2002 mergers and acquisitions
2020 mergers and acquisitions
Food and drink in the San Francisco Bay Area
American subsidiaries of foreign companies